Noha Hany (born 25 February 2001) is an Egyptian fencer. She competed in the women's foil event at the 2020 Summer Olympics.

She competed at the 2018 African Fencing Championships, and the 2019 African Fencing Championships.

References

External links
 

2001 births
Living people
Egyptian female foil fencers
Olympic fencers of Egypt
Fencers at the 2020 Summer Olympics
Place of birth missing (living people)
Fencers at the 2018 Summer Youth Olympics
African Games medalists in fencing
21st-century Egyptian women
African Games silver medalists for Egypt
Competitors at the 2019 African Games